Melarthonis is fungal genus in the family Chrysotrichaceae. It is a monotypic genus, containing the single species Melarthonis piceae, a corticolous lichen. Both the genus and species were described as new to science in 2014 by Andreas Frisch and Göran Thor. It is only known to occur in the type locality. The genus name alludes to the black ascomata that are similar to those in genus Arthonia, while the species epithet refers to the genus of the host tree (Picea).

References

Arthoniomycetes
Lichen genera
Taxa described in 2014
Arthoniomycetes genera
Monotypic Ascomycota genera